The Bradford Dukes were a British motorcycle speedway team which operated from the Odsal Stadium in Bradford from 1986 until their closure in 1997.

History
Speedway has long been associated with Odsal Stadium; there have been three eras of racing activity at the venue spanning the years 1945-1960, 1970-1975 and most recently 1985-1997. There was also a short-lived existence at the old Greenfield Stadium between 1961-1962.

Speedway returned to Odsal in 1985 after a ten-year absence when it was selected by the Fédération Internationale de Motocyclisme to host the 1985 Speedway World Championship. Bradford Council were quick to seize on the prestige of being associated with a World event and approved £1 million project to refurbish the Odsal Stadium. A 40,000 crowd attended at the final.

In March 1986, Odsal opened its doors to British League action for the first time since the 1950s after the Halifax Dukes were offered a new home track. The new 'Bradford Dukes' team would in later years include Gary Havelock, the multi-British Champion Simon Wigg, England number one Kelvin Tatum and Mark Loram. However, the club suffered the loss of Kenny Carter who died in a shooting incident during their first season.

Bradford speedway then enjoyed its greatest period of success winning eight trophies and a World Title until the club's closure in 1997 when despite winning the Elite League, the club folded for the third time. The success included four Knockout Cup wins from 1991 to 1995, three of which were in consecutive years.

In 2013 businessman Tony Mole successfully applied for planning permission to again use Odsal for speedway, with the possibility of racing returning in 2014 with the Bradford and Halifax Dukes.

World Champions
Gary Havelock became Speedway World Champion whilst a Bradford rider in 1992, winning the title at the Olympic Stadium in Wroclaw, Poland.

Notable riders

Season summary

See also
 Odsal Boomerangs
 Bradford Tudors
 Bradford Panthers
 Bradford Barons
 Bradford Northern (speedway)
 List of defunct motorcycle speedway teams in the United Kingdom

References

Sport in Bradford
Defunct British speedway teams